Van Lieshout is a Dutch toponymic surname, meaning "from Lieshout", a town in North Brabant. People with the surname include:

Cilia van Lieshout (born 1941), Dutch film producer
Erik van Lieshout (born 1968), Dutch installation artist
Eustáquio van Lieshout (1890–1943), Dutch missionary in Brazil
Henry van Lieshout (1932–2009), Papua New Guinean Roman Catholic bishop
Joep van Lieshout (born 1963), Dutch artist
John Van Lieshout (born 1946), Australian billionaire
 (born 1969), Dutch javelin thrower
Maarten Van Lieshout (born 1985), Belgian footballer
Ted van Lieshout (born 1955), Dutch writer, poet, screenwriter and illustrator
Teresa van Lieshout (born 1971), Australian perennial candidate
Trixie van Lieshout (born 1948), Matildas Coach 1981

References

Dutch-language surnames
Surnames of Dutch origin
Toponymic surnames